Richard John Dufallo (30 January 1933 in Whiting, Indiana – 16 June 2000 in Denton, Texas) was an American clarinetist, author, and conductor with a broad repertory.  He is most known for his interpretations of contemporary music.  During the 1970s, he directed contemporary music series at both Juilliard and the Aspen Music Festival, where he succeeded Darius Milhaud as artistic director of the Conference on Contemporary Music.  He was influential at getting American works accepted in Europe, and gave the first European performances of works by Charles Ives, Carl Ruggles, Jacob Druckman, and Elliott Carter as well as younger composers like Robert Beaser.  Dufallo, as conductor, also premiered numerous works by European composers, including Karlheinz Stockhausen, Sir Peter Maxwell Davies, and Krzystof Penderecki.  He was a former assistant conductor of the New York Philharmonic, and worked closely with Leonard Bernstein from 1965 to 1975. He also served as associate conductor of the Buffalo Philharmonic.

Early years 
From 1950 to 1953, Dufallo studied clarinet at the American Conservatory of Music in Chicago. He later studied with the composer and conductor Lukas Foss at the University of California, Los Angeles where he earned his bachelor's and master's degrees.  Foss became an important mentor and invited Dufallo to become the clarinetist in his Improvisation Chamber Ensemble.  Dufallo was an associate conductor at the Buffalo Philharmonic in the mid-1960s during Mr. Foss's tenure as music director there.

Family
Dufallo married Zaidee Parkinson (an American pianist, b. 1937) on October 15, 1966 and they divorced in 1985. They had two children, Basil (a Professor at the University of Michigan) and  Cornelius (an internationally acclaimed violinist and composer). He married Pamela Mia Paul on June 19, 1988. Paul is an American concert pianist, a Steinway Artist, and a Regents Professor at the University of North Texas College of Music. Dufallo also had a daughter, Rene Kirby of Los Angeles, and a sister, Kathryn Traczyk, who lives in Indiana.

External links 
Dufallo papers
 Richard Dufallo Collection at the University of North Texas Music Library
 The collection includes audio tapes of interviews that Dufallo held with various twentieth-century composers

 The University of North Texas College of Music annually awards a memorial scholarship to a composition student in honor of Dufallo.

References 
General references
 Biography Index; A cumulative index to biographical material in books and magazines; Volume 26: September 2000 – August 2001, New York: H. W. Wilson Co., 2001
 The New York Times Biographical Edition; A compilation of current biographical information of general interest; Volume 1, Numbers 1–12, New York: Arno Press, 1970
 Baker's Biographical Dictionary of Musicians; Sixth edition, revised by Nicolas Slonimsky, London: Collier Macmillan Publishers
 Baker's Biographical Dictionary of Musicians; Seventh edition, revised by Nicolas Slonimsky, New York: Macmillan Publishing Co., Schirmer Books, 1984
 Baker's Dictionary of Opera, edited by Laura Kuhn, New York: Schirmer Books, 2000
 Baker's Biographical Dictionary of Musicians; Eighth edition, revised by Nicolas Slonimsky, New York: Macmillan Publishing Co., 1992
 Baker's Biographical Dictionary of Twentieth-Century Classical Musicians, by Nicolas Slonimsky, New York: Schirmer Books, 1997
 Baker's Biographical Dictionary of Musicians; Ninth edition, Edited by Laura Kuhn, New York: Schirmer Books, 2001
 Biography Index; A cumulative index to biographical material in books and magazines; Volume 9, September 1970–August 1973, New York: H.W. Wilson Co., 1974
 Contemporary Authors; A bio-bibliographical guide to current writers in fiction, general nonfiction, poetry, journalism, drama, motion pictures, television, and other fields, Volume 133, Detroit: Gale Research, 1991
 The New Grove Dictionary of American Music, Four volumes, edited by H. Wiley Hitchcock and Stanley Sadie, London: Macmillan Press, 1986
 The Penguin Dictionary of Musical Performers; A biographical guide to significant interpreters of classical music - singers, solo instrumentalists, conductors, orchestras and string quartets - ranging from the seventeenth century to the present day, by Arthur Jacobs, London: Viking, 1990
 The Writers Directory; 11th edition, 1994-1996, Detroit: St. James Press, 1994
 The Writers Directory; 12th edition, 1996-1998, Detroit: St. James Press, 1996
 The Writers Directory; 13th edition, 1998-2000, Detroit: St. James Press, 1997
 The Writers Directory; 14th edition, 1999, Detroit: St. James Press, 1999
 The Writers Directory; 15th edition, 2000, Detroit: St. James Press, 2000
 The Writers Directory, 16th edition, 2001, Detroit: St. James Press, 2001
 Contemporary Authors: A bio-bibliographical guide to current writers in fiction, general nonfiction, poetry, journalism, drama, motion pictures, television, and other fields, Volume 188. Detroit: Gale Group, 2001
 The New York Times Biographical Service: A compilation of current biographical information of general interest, Volume 31, Numbers 1- 12. Ann Arbor, MI: Bell & Howell Information & Learning Co., 2000
 International Who's Who in Music and Musicians' Directory, 12th edition, 1990–1991, Cambridge, England: International Who's Who in Music, 1990. Taylor and Francis International Publication Services, Bristol, PA
 The New Grove Dictionary of Opera, Four volumes, edited by Stanley Sadie, New York: Grove's Dictionaries of Music
 Who Was Who in America; With world notables, Volume 14, 2000-2002, New Providence, NJ: Marquis Who's Who, 2002
 Who's Who in American Music: Classical, New York: R.R. Bowker, 1983
 Who's Who in Entertainment; Third edition, 1998- 1999, New Providence, NJ: Marquis Who's Who, 1997
 Who's Who in the South and Southwest; 24th edition, 1995-1996, New Providence, NJ: Marquis Who's Who, 1995
 Who's Who in the South and Southwest; 25th edition, 1997-1998,'' New Providence, NJ: Marquis Who's Who, 1997

Inline citations

1933 births
2000 deaths
American classical musicians
Aspen Music Festival and School faculty
Contemporary classical music performers
American male conductors (music)
American Conservatory of Music alumni
University of North Texas College of Music faculty
People from Whiting, Indiana
20th-century American conductors (music)
20th-century American male musicians